Aerangis gracillima is a species of plant in the family Orchidaceae. It is found in Cameroon and Gabon. Its natural habitat is subtropical or tropical dry forests.

It was previously placed alone in genus Barombia.

Sources 

gracillima
Orchids of Cameroon
Orchids of Gabon
Near threatened plants
Taxonomy articles created by Polbot